Allied Forces North Norway (NON) was a NATO command tasked with the defense of Northern Norway. NON's area of responsibility covered the three northernmost counties of Norway: Nordland, Troms and Finnmark, as well as the adjacent sea territory. It formed part of Allied Forces Northern Europe.

History 
Allied Forces North Norway (NON) was activated in 1962 along with Allied Forces South Norway (SONOR) and Allied Forces Baltic Approaches. Unlike most other NATO commands NON was a staffed entirely by members of the Norwegian Armed Forces. Its operational headquarters was located in a bunker at Reitan, which today is used as the Norwegian Joint Headquarters. The commander of NON had three deputies: Commander Land Forces North Norway, Commander Air Forces North Norway and Commander Naval Forces North Norway. Incoming allied units would have come under the command of these three deputy commanders.

Structure in 1989 
NON had the following units at its disposal to fight an attack by the Soviet Union's 6th Army:

 Allied Forces North Norway (NON), commanded by a Norwegian lieutenant general:

Commander Naval Forces North Norway 

Naval Forces North Norway (NAVNON) was tasked with the defence of Northern Norway's coastal waters against Soviet naval incursions and amphibious landings. Operations in the ocean beyond Norway's coastal waters were under the command of NATO Supreme Allied Commander Atlantic's (SACLANT) Northern Sub-Area Command (NORLANT). Therefore NAVNON consisted of coastal artillery units and one fast attack craft squadron. The boats for the fast attack craft squadron were dispatched from units in Southern Norway on a rotational basis.

 Commander Naval Forces North Norway (NAVNON), commanded by a Norwegian rear admiral:
 Olavsvern Naval Base near Tromsø
 22nd Fast Attack Craft Squadron
 Ramsund Naval Base near Narvik
 Sortland Naval Base in Sortland
 Coastal Artillery
 Nordland county:
 Bremnes Fortress in Bodø
 Ofotfjord defenses to protect Narvik
 Korshamn Torpedo Battery in Ballangen
 Porsøy Torpedo Battery in Ballangen
 Nes Fort in Lødingen with 2x 120mm Tornautomatpjäs m/70 automatic guns
 Tjeldøy Fort in Tjeldsund
 Troms county:
 Andfjorden defenses to protect Harstad
 Sandsøy Fort on Sandsøya
 Meløyvær Fortress on Krøttøya with 3x 120mm Tornautomatpjäs m/70 automatic guns
 Skrolsvik Fort in Skrollsvika
 Trondenes Fort in Harstad
 Grøtavær Fort on Grytøya
 Stangnes Fort in Harstad
 Malangen Fjord and Gisundet defenses, covering the Northern entry of the Andfjorden
 Malangen Torpedo Battery in Tennskjær
 Rødbergodden Fort in Aglapsvik
 Gibostad Fort in Gibostad
 Skorliodden Fort in Vangshamn
 Tromsø defenses
 Grøtsund Fort covering the Northern side of Tromsø
 Breiviknes Fort in Ramfjordbotn with 3x 75mm Tornpjäs m/57 automatic guns covering the Northern entry of the Grøtsundet and the Ullsfjorden
 Årøybukt Fort in Lyngseidet with 3x 75mm Tornpjäs m/57 automatic guns to defend the Lyngenfjord

Commander Air Forces North Norway 

 Commander Air Forces North Norway (AIRNON), commanded by a Norwegian major general:
 Control and Reporting Centre Sørreisa managed by the 131st Air Wing
 Bodø Air Station
 132nd Air Wing
 331st Fighter/Bomber Squadron with 18x F-16A
 334th Fighter/Bomber Squadron with 18x F-16A
 719th Transport Squadron with 3x DHC-6 Twin Otter and 6x UH-1B
 Norwegian Adapted Hawk air-defense battery with 3x Hawk launchers and 3x 40mm L/70 radar-guided anti-aircraft guns
 Search and Rescue Detachment from the 330th Helicopter Squadron with 2x Sea King Mk43
 Bardufoss Air Station
 139th Air Wing
 337th Helicopter Squadron with 6x Lynx Mk.86
 339th Helicopter Squadron with 12x Bell 412
 Norwegian Adapted Hawk air-defense battery with 3x Hawk launchers and 3x 40mm L/70 radar-guided anti-aircraft guns
 Andøya Air Station
 133rd Air Wing
 333rd Squadron with 6x P-3C Orion
 Norwegian Adapted Hawk air-defense battery with 3x Hawk launchers and 3x 40mm L/70 radar-guided anti-aircraft guns
 Banak Air Station
 Search and Rescue Detachment from the 330th Helicopter Squadron with 2x Sea King Mk43
 Norwegian Adapted Hawk air-defense battery with 3x Hawk launchers and 3x 40mm L/70 radar-guided anti-aircraft guns at Evenes Air Station to defend the vital airport and harbor at Narvik

Commander Land Forces North Norway 

 Commander Land Forces North Norway (LANDNON), commanded by a Norwegian major general:
 6th Division in Harstad
 Brigade North Norway in Bardufoss (Active unit)
 Brigade Staff Company in Heggelia 
 1st Armored Infantry Battalion in Setermoen with 26 Leopard 1 tanks, 29x NM135 infantry fighting vehicles
 2nd Infantry Battalion in Øverbygd with Bandvagn 206, 4x NM142 ATGM carriers and 4x M106 mortar carriers
 3rd Infantry Battalion in Harstad with Bandvagn 206, 4x NM142 ATGM carriers and 4x M106 mortar carriers
 Field Artillery Battalion in Setermoen with 18x M109G 155mm self-propelled howitzers
 Reconnaissance Squadron in Øverbygd with 3x NM135 infantry fighting vehicles 
 Anti-tank Missile Company in Setermoen with 4x NM142 ATGM carriers and 4x NM116 light tanks
 Anti-Aircraft Battery in Heggelia with 6x NM195 anti-air missile vehicles and 6x 40mm L/60 anti-aircraft guns
 Engineer Company in Øverbygd
 Mounted Squadron in Øverbygd with pack horses
 Signal Company in Heggelia
 Supply Company in Heggelia
 Transport Company in Heggelia
 Maintenance Company in Heggelia
 Medical Company in Setermoen
 Artillery Observation Platoon in Setermoen with 2x Cessna O-1A planes
 Military Police Platoon in Heggelia
 Brigade 14 (Norwegian Home Guard District 14 mobilization unit) in Mosjøen
 1st Infantry Battalion with Bandvagn 206, 4x TOW ATGM missile launchers and 4x M30 107mm mortars
 2nd Infantry Battalion with Bandvagn 206, 4x TOW ATGM missile launchers and 4x M30 107mm mortars
 3rd Infantry Battalion with Bandvagn 206, 4x TOW ATGM missile launchers and 4x M30 107mm mortars
 Field Artillery Battalion with 24x M109G 155mm self-propelled howitzers
 Reconnaissance Squadron with 3x NM135 infantry fighting vehicles 
 Anti-tank Missile Company with 4x NM142 ATGM carriers and 4x NM116 light tanks
 Anti-Aircraft Battery with 6x RBS 70 man-portable air-defense systems and 6x 40mm L/60 anti-aircraft guns
 Engineer Company
 Brigade 15 (Norwegian Home Guard District 15 and Norwegian Home Guard District 16 mobilization unit) in Bardu
 1st Infantry Battalion with Bandvagn 206, 4x TOW ATGM missile launchers and 4x M30 107mm mortars
 2nd Infantry Battalion with Bandvagn 206, 4x TOW ATGM missile launchers and 4x M30 107mm mortars
 3rd Infantry Battalion with Bandvagn 206, 4x TOW ATGM missile launchers and 4x M30 107mm mortars
 Field Artillery Battalion with 18x M109G 155mm self-propelled howitzers
 Reconnaissance Squadron with 3x NM135 infantry fighting vehicles 
 Anti-tank Missile Company with 4x NM142 ATGM carriers and 4x NM116 light tanks
 Anti-Aircraft Battery with 6x RBS 70 man-portable air-defense systems and 6x 40mm L/60 anti-aircraft guns
 Engineer Company
 Garnisonen i Sør-Varanger (Active unit based at the Soviet-Norwegian border) in Høybuktmoen
 Varanger Infantry Battalion with Bandvagn 206, 4x TOW ATGM missile launchers and 4x M30 107mm mortars
 Artillery Battery with 6x M109G 155mm self-propelled howitzers
 Garnisonen i Porsanger (Active unit) in Porsangmoen
 Porsanger Infantry Battalion with Bandvagn 206, 4x TOW ATGM missile launchers and 4x M30 107mm mortars
 Tank Company with 13x Leopard 1 tanks
 Artillery Battery with 6x M109G 155mm self-propelled howitzers
 Hålogaland Engineer Battalion
 Hålogaland Signal Battalion
 Hålogaland Medical Battalion
 Bjerkvik Maintenance Workshop
 Norwegian Home Guard District 14 Sør-Hålogaland – Mosjøen and Vefsn (Home Guard in Southern Nordland)
 Norwegian Home Guard District 15 Nord-Hålogaland in Elvegårdsmoen and Bjerkvik (Home Guard in Northern Nordland)
 Norwegian Home Guard District 16 Troms in Bardu (Home Guard in Troms)
 Norwegian Home Guard District 17 Vest-Finnmark in Alta (Home Guard in Western Finnmark county)
 Alta Infantry Battalion with Bandvagn 206, 4x TOW ATGM missile launchers and 4x M30 107mm mortars
 Artillery Battery with 6x M109G 155mm self-propelled howitzers
 Norwegian Home Guard District 18 Øst-Finnmark in Høybuktmoen (Home Guard in Eastern Finnmark)
 Infantry Battalion with Bandvagn 206, 4x TOW ATGM missile launchers and 4x M30 107mm mortars

Reinforcements 

NON would have been reinforced by the following Norwegian units from Allied Forces South Norway:

 Brigade 5 (Norwegian Home Guard District 5 mobilization unit) in Terningmoen in Eastern Norway, equipment pre-positioned in Northern Norway
 1st Infantry Battalion 
 2nd Infantry Battalion 
 3rd Infantry Battalion 
 Field Artillery Battalion with M109G 155mm self-propelled howitzers
 Reconnaissance Squadron 
 Anti-tank Missile Company
 Anti-Aircraft Battery 
 Engineer Company
 Artillery Observation Platoon with 2x Cessna O-1A planes
 Brigade 6 (Norwegian Home Guard District 6 mobilization unit) in Hønefoss in Eastern Norway, equipment pre-positioned in Northern Norway
 1st Infantry Battalion 
 2nd Infantry Battalion 
 3rd Infantry Battalion 
 Field Artillery Battalion with M114 155mm towed howitzers
 Reconnaissance Squadron 

NATO would have planned to reinforce Allied Forces North Norway with 2–7 days with the following allied formations:

 Allied Land Forces:
 Royal Navy: 3 Commando Brigade including 1 Amphibious Combat Group and Whiskey Company of the Netherlands Marine Corps. The brigade trained annually in Northern Norway and had large stores of vehicles and supplies pre-positioned there.
 U.S. Marine Corps: the 4th Marine Amphibious Brigade of the II Marine Amphibious Force (also known as Norway Air-Landed Marine Expeditionary Brigade (NALMEB)) had its equipment pre-positioned in eight purpose-built caves near the Værnes Air Station in Trondheim in central Norway. The eight caves contained material for 15,000 troops and war stocks for 30 days. Three of the caves held ground equipment, three munitions and two held aviation support equipment for two air defense and two ground attack squadrons, as well as for 75 heavy transport and light support helicopters. Exercise Teamwork, held every two years during the 1980s, practiced reinforcement of Norway. After that point Exercise Battle Griffin was held in 1993 and 1996.
 Allied Air Forces:
 United States Air Force: eight squadrons
 Royal Air Force: one squadron

U.S. Forces in Northern Norway 
The US military maintained three small units in Northern Norway.

 United States European Command
 United States Navy
 Fleet Hospital Support Facility 8, in Bogen to maintain the stored Fleet Hospital Eight
 US Coast Guard
 LORAN-C Transmitting Station Bø, in Bø
 LORAN-C Transmitting Station Jan Mayen, on Jan Mayen

References

External links
http://www.fireandfury.com/orbats/modcwnorwegian.pdf - wargaming source with TOE details. Uncertain reliability.

Formations of the NATO Military Command Structure 1952–1994
Military units and formations established in 1952
Military units and formations disestablished in 1994
Military history of Norway